Erik Wennberg (28 March 1910 – 1982) was a Swedish middle-distance runner who won the national 800 m title in 1934 and 1935. He placed fifth in this event at the 1934 European Championships.

References

Swedish male middle-distance runners
1910 births
1982 deaths
People from Trelleborg
Sportspeople from Skåne County